Milton Berkes (September 29, 1924 – April 3, 2015)  was an American politician who was a Democratic member of the Pennsylvania House of Representatives.
 Berkes was active in matters concerning alcohol and drug abuse, propagating for a generally healthy lifestyle. He died in 2015 at a hospice in Langhorne, Pennsylvania.

References

Democratic Party members of the Pennsylvania House of Representatives
1924 births
2015 deaths
People from Levittown, Pennsylvania